The 2009 Saginaw Sting season was the 2nd season for the American Indoor Football League franchise. A number of Sting and Xplosion players indicated at the end of the 2008 season that wages were in arrears from the owners.  This led to an investigation of Johnson in his role as Sting general manager.  Trumbull, owner of Triple Threat Sports in Battle Creek, and Rivera, a Battle Creek police officer, have offered a deal to split ownership of the two teams, with Trumbell and Rivera owning the Sting, and Johnson receiving the Xplosion.  Trumbull and Rivera have indicated that they plan for the Sting to move to the new Indoor Football League. The Sting looked to have put together a promising team with the re-signing of QB Damon Dowdell, and signing 2007 CIFL MVP, WR/RB Robert Height, but the team fared poorly on the field in the IFL. After a 2-2 start to the season, head coach Karl Featherstone resigned from his position and assistant Jason Lovelock took over as interim head coach.

Schedule

Standings

 Green indicates clinched playoff berth
 Purple indicates division champion

Roster

References

Saginaw Sting
Saginaw Sting
Saginaw Sting